Susan Pickett is a violinist, musicologist, and Catharine Gould Chism Chair of Music at Whitman College in Walla Walla, Washington. She has authored numerous books in musicology, including "Marion and Emilie Frances Bauer: From the Wild West to American Musical Modernism."

References

American musicologists
American women musicologists
Whitman College faculty
Occidental College alumni
Living people
Year of birth missing (living people)
21st-century American violinists
21st-century American women musicians